Argnesa Rexhepi (born 23 November 2000) is a Kosovan footballer who plays as a midfielder for Swiss club Zürich U21 and the Kosovo national team.

See also
List of Kosovo women's international footballers

References

2000 births
Living people
Kosovan women's footballers
Women's association football midfielders
Kosovo women's international footballers